Krowor  is one of the constituencies represented in the Parliament of Ghana. It elects one Member of Parliament (MP) by the first past the post system of election. Krowor  is located in the Ledzokuku-Krowor Municipal District of the Greater Accra Region of Ghana.

Boundaries
The seat is located entirely within the Ledzokuku-Krowor Municipal District of the Greater Accra Region of Ghana.

Members of Parliament

Elections

See also
List of Ghana Parliament constituencies
Parliamentary constituencies in the Greater Accra Region

References 

Parliamentary constituencies in the Greater Accra Region